Taro was a department of the First French Empire in present-day Italy. It was named after the Taro River. It was formed in 1808, when the Duchy of Parma and Piacenza was annexed by France under the Treaty of Lunéville. Its capital was Parma.

The department was disbanded after the defeat of Napoleon in 1814. At the Congress of Vienna, the Duchy was restored and given to Marie Louise, Napoleon's wife. Its territory is now divided between the Italian provinces of Parma and Piacenza.

The most notable person born in the then-Département of Taro was the composer Giuseppe Verdi (born 9 or 10 October 1813 in the village of Le Roncole near Busseto).

Subdivision
The department was subdivided into the following arrondissements and cantons (situation in 1812):

 Parma, cantons: Colorno, Corniglio, San Donato, Fornovo, Langhirano, San Pancrazio, Parma (2 cantons), Poviglio, Sissa, Traversetolo and Vairo.
 Piacenza, cantons: Agazzano, Bettola, Borgonovo, Castel San Giovanni, Pianello, Piacenza (2 cantons), Ponte dell'Olio, Pontenure, Rivergaro and Rottofreno.
 Borgo San Donnino, cantons: Bardi, Borgo San Donnino, Busseto, Carpaneto, Cortemaggiore, Fiorenzuola, Fontanellato, Lugagnano, Monticelli, Noceto, Pellegrino, San Secondo and Zibello.

Its population in 1812 was 376,558, and its area was approximately 502,236 hectares.

References

Former departments of France in Italy
1808 establishments in the First French Empire
Duchy of Parma